Show Me Your Love may refer to:

 "Show Me Your Love" (Tina Karol song), 2006
 Show Me Your Love, a 2006 album by Tina Karol
 "Show Me Your Love" (Fady Maalouf song), 2008
 "Show Me Your Love" (TVXQ and Super Junior song), 2005
 "Show Me Your Love", a song by The Chevelles
 "Show Me Your Love", a song by Clover
 "Show Me Your Love", a song by Emi Maria from Contrast
 "Show Me Your Love", a song by Immature from the film soundtrack album Kazaam
 "Show Me Your Love", a song by The Rembrandts from The Rembrandts
 "Show Me Your Love", a song by S.E.S. from A Letter from Greenland
 "Show Me Your Love", a song by The Temptations from Surface Thrills
 "Feels So Good (Show Me Your Love)", a song by Lina Santiago
 Show Me Your Love (film), a 2016 Hong Kong drama film directed by Ryon Lee and starring Nina Paw and Raymond Wong

See also 
 Show Me Love (disambiguation)